Eriogonum rosense is a species of wild buckwheat known by the common name rosy buckwheat. It is native to the mountains of eastern California and its range extends into Nevada.

Description
This is a small perennial herb which forms mats up to about 20 centimeters wide on dry, rocky mountain slopes. It produces clumps of glandular, coarsely woolly leaves, each about a centimeter long and erects inflorescences on naked, woolly stalks. The flower clusters are generally rounded and the flowers are bright yellow to red-streaked orange.

External links
Jepson Manual Treatment - Eriogonum rosense
Eriogonum rosense - Photo gallery

rosense
Flora of California
Flora of Nevada
Flora of the Sierra Nevada (United States)
Flora without expected TNC conservation status